Lena Dąbkowska-Cichocka  is a Polish politician. She is a member of the Sejm and the Parliamentary Assembly of the Council of Europe (PACE).

Biography
Lena Dąbkowska-Cichocka was born in Moscow on November 23, 1973. Formerly a member of Law and Justice, she is a member of Poland Comes First in Poland and the European Democrat Group in the PACE.

References

Living people
1973 births
Politicians from Moscow
Poland Comes First politicians
Law and Justice politicians
Members of the Polish Sejm 2007–2011
Women members of the Sejm of the Republic of Poland
Knights of the Order of Polonia Restituta
Recipients of the Silver Medal for Merit to Culture – Gloria Artis
21st-century Polish women politicians
Aleksander Zelwerowicz National Academy of Dramatic Art in Warsaw alumni